Taman Pertama MRT station is a mass rapid transit (MRT) station on the MRT Kajang Line (KG Line) in Cheras constituency, Kuala Lumpur, Malaysia. It is located along Federal Route 1 Jalan Cheras, which is just right next to where it branches to Jalan Loke Yew, Jalan Yaacob Latif and Jalan Cheras. It was opened on 17 July 2017, along with 18 adjoining stations as part of Phase Two of the MRT SBK line.

The MRT Taman Pertama station was provisionally known as Taman Bukit Ria during construction. This is the first elevated station (towards Kajang) after exiting the underground section at Maluri.

The station serves the nearby suburbs of Taman Pertama, Taman Bukit Ria, several DBKL public housing complexes and parts of Bandar Tun Razak. The station is also near the former site of the now-demolished Cheras Velodrome.

Station Background

Station Layout 
The station has a layout and design similar to that of most other elevated stations on the line (except the terminus and underground stations), with the platform level on the topmost floor, consisting of two sheltered side platforms along a double tracked line and a single concourse housing ticketing facilities between the ground level and the platform level. All levels are linked by lifts, stairways and escalators.

Exits and entrances 
The station has two entrances, where Entrance A leads to Taman Pertama and Entrance B leads to Velodrom Kuala Lumpur. There is an overhead bridge which is above Jalan Cheras while walking to Entrance B.

Bus Services 
There is no MRT feeder bus services at this station as there is no feeder bus hub. However, the station provides some linkage to some other bus services, as well as MRT feeder bus from other station. It requires some walking to reach the station.

MRT Feeder Bus Services

Other Bus Services

References

External links
 Taman Pertama MRT Station | mrt.com.my

Rapid transit stations in Kuala Lumpur
Sungai Buloh-Kajang Line
Railway stations opened in 2017